Kim Marie Willoughby (born November 7, 1980) is a retired American indoor volleyball player. She is 5'11" (1.80 m) and is an outside hitter. In 2007, she played professionally for the Italian Serie A League Familia Chieri. In April 2008, she joined the U.S. national team. Willoughby made her Olympic debut at the 2008 Beijing Olympics, helping the US to a silver medal.

Playing with Colussi Sirio Perugia she won the bronze medal at the 2008–09 CEV Indesit Champions League, and she was awarded "Best Receiver".

Personal life
Kim was born in Houma, Louisiana, and grew up in Napoleonville, Louisiana, where she attended Assumption High School. She not only played volleyball, but also lettered in track & field and basketball. She led her high school volleyball team to three consecutive state championships and was named the Louisiana Player of the Year her junior and senior seasons and was a First Team All-American.

Her parents are Vincent Gaines and Lula Willoughby. During Kim's junior year, her mother was in a car accident that led to two strokes and paralysis from the waist down. More tragedy struck after Kim's boyfriend was shot after an argument and died, and she admits that she was angry and fought often when she was young.

Four time U.S. Olympian Danielle Scott-Arruda is her third cousin.

Legal troubles
Willoughby has had a record with the law, for assault. In September 2008, she was arrested, was charged with first degree assault and eventually pleaded not guilty stemming from an incident in December 2006. The incident occurred when Willoughby allegedly caused serious bodily injuries to a woman, Sara Daniel, at Pipeline Cafe in Kakaako. The alleged assault led to Daniel suffering severe bone fractures in her face. Willoughby claimed self-defense, but prosecutor Sherri Chun disagreed, saying "This incident was not self-defense. She (Willoughby) followed her (Daniel) out of the club, and that's when this all happened." Willoughby posted $50,000 bail. On May 18, 2009, Willoughby pleaded no contest in a plea agreement with the state and was sentenced to five years probation.

On June 28, 2007, Willoughby was charged with first and second degree assault, with both degrees stemming from separate incidents, one being in 2006. On June 8, 2001, Honolulu police charged her with abuse of a family or household member and third-degree assault. Five days after police charged Willoughby in the case, the victim filed for a temporary restraining order against her, leading to a judge to issue a three-year protective order.

Positive drug test
Willoughby tested positive for nandrolone after a match for her Italian team Perugia in April 2009. On September 11, 2009, it was announced that Willoughby was given a two-year suspension from the Italian Olympic Committee, to end on July 10, 2011.

Completion of College and Ending of Probation
In January, 2012, Willoughby was granted an early ending of her probation for the 2008 Daniels' assault conviction.

Indictment for Murder and Child Abuse
On September 20, 2018, Willoughby was indicted in Puerto Rico on first degree murder and child abuse charges in Puerto Rico. Her trial is scheduled to begin October 4, 2018.

College
At the University of Hawaii, Willoughby was a three time American Volleyball Coaches Association All-America honoree and was named the National Player of the Year in 2003. As a senior in 2003, she ranked second nationally in kills per game with 6.60 while adding averages of 3.04 digs, 0.62 aces, 0.57 blocks and 0.41 assists per game. She hit .373 in her final collegiate season to help the Rainbow Wahine to the NCAA Division I Women's Volleyball Tournament national semifinals for the second consecutive year. As a junior in 2002, Willoughby charted a 6.31 kill average to finish in the top three nationally. She recorded a .342 hitting percentage and averaged 3.35 digs, 0.70 aces, 0.61 blocks and 0.30 assists per game. She led the nation in kills as a sophomore in 2001, posting a 7.20 kill average. Additionally, she led her team with a 3.66 dig average, breaking the school's single season dig average record at the time. For her career, she averaged 5.91 kills per game, which ranked third-best in NCAA history at the time. Also had career totals of 1,440 digs, 194 aces and 291 blocks over 459 career games. Willoughby was a four-year starter in college, playing the opposite/right-side hitter position as a freshman and emerging as the team's go-to player as an outside hitter in her last three seasons. She was also a four-time All-Western Athletic Conference honoree, garnering second team laurels as a freshman in 2000 and earning first team honors in 2001, 2002 and 2003. She was also awarded the Western Athletic Conference Player of the Year title in her final three years.

Awards

Individual
 2008–09 CEV Indesit Champions League Final Four "Best Receiver"

College
 3-Time NCAA 1st Team All-American 2001, 2002, 2003
 2003 NCAA National Player of the Year 
3-Time NCAA 1st Team All-Region 2001, 2002, 2003
 3-Time WAC 1st Team All-Conference 2001, 2002, 2003
 3-Time WAC Player of the Year 2001, 2002, 2003
 2000 WAC Co-Freshman of the Year

References

External links
Kim Willougby player profile at uhathletics.com
U.S. national team bio

1980 births
Living people
Sportspeople from Houma, Louisiana
American women's volleyball players
Hawaii Rainbow Wahine volleyball players
Volleyball players at the 2008 Summer Olympics
Olympic silver medalists for the United States in volleyball
Medalists at the 2008 Summer Olympics
American expatriate sportspeople in Spain
Expatriate volleyball players in Spain
People from Napoleonville, Louisiana
Outside hitters
African-American volleyball players
Expatriate volleyball players in Italy
Expatriate volleyball players in Azerbaijan
American expatriate sportspeople in Italy
American expatriate sportspeople in Azerbaijan
21st-century African-American sportspeople
21st-century African-American women
20th-century African-American people
20th-century African-American women
Doping cases in volleyball
Serie A1 (women's volleyball) players